William Albert Wack, C.S.C. (born June 28, 1967) is an American prelate of the Roman Catholic Church, serving as the bishop of the Diocese of Pensacola–Tallahassee in Florida since August 22, 2017.

Early life
William Wack was born June 28, 1967, in South Bend, Indiana. He is the second youngest of ten children, including a younger brother who followed him into the priesthood. After graduating from LaSalle High School and attending Holy Cross College in Notre Dame, Indiana, for one year, Wack transferred to the University of Notre Dame. He graduated in 1989 with a degree in government and international relations.

Wack entered the novitiate for the Congregation of Holy Cross in August 1989 and professed temporary vows in 1990. He returned to Notre Dame, where he received a Master of Divinity degree in May 1993. On August 28, 1993, Wack professed solemn vows as a member of the Congregation of Holy Cross and was ordained a deacon the following day.

Priesthood 
On April 9, 1994, Wack was ordained to the priesthood for the Congregation Order by Archbishop James  MacDonald. His first assignment was as associate pastor of Sacred Heart Parish in Colorado Springs, Colorado for three-plus years. From July 1997 to July 2002, he served as associate director of vocations for Holy Cross, as well as working in campus ministry at Notre Dame. He served as director of André House, a facility serving the homeless and poor of Phoenix, Arizona, from 2002 until December 2008. In June 2009, Wack moved to Austin, Texas to become pastor of St. Ignatius Martyr Parish.

Bishop of Pensacola-Tallahassee 
On May 29, 2017, Pope Francis appointed Wack as diocesan bishop for the Diocese of Pensacola–Tallahassee. On August 22, 2017, Wack was consecrated by Archbishop Thomas Wenski.

See also

 Catholic Church hierarchy
 Catholic Church in the United States
 Historical list of the Catholic bishops of the United States
 List of Catholic bishops of the United States
 Lists of patriarchs, archbishops, and bishops

References

External links
  Roman Catholic Diocese of  Pensacola–Tallahassee Official Website
 Bishop William Albert Wack, C.S.C. (Catholic-Hierarchy.org)

Episcopal succession

 

1967 births
Living people
People from South Bend, Indiana
University of Notre Dame alumni
Roman Catholic bishops of Pensacola–Tallahassee
Catholics from Indiana
Congregation of Holy Cross bishops
21st-century Roman Catholic bishops in the United States
Bishops appointed by Pope Francis
Holy Cross College (Indiana) alumni